Eve Laurel Forward is an author and television screenwriter. She is the daughter of American physicist and popular science fiction author Robert L. Forward, and the sister of Bob Forward, also a writer and film director.

Books
 Villains by Necessity (Tor Books, 1995) 
 The Animist (Tor, 2000)
 GyreWorld: Book One - The Turning City (Detonation Films, 2015) by Forward with her brother Bob Forward as co-author

Television
 The Legend of Zelda (1989)
 GI Joe: A Real American Hero (1991)
 Hammerman (1991)
 Biker Mice from Mars (1993-1994)
 Biker Mice from Mars (2006-2007)

References

External links

 

1972 births
20th-century American novelists
21st-century American novelists
American fantasy writers
American women novelists
Living people
Place of birth missing (living people)
Women science fiction and fantasy writers
20th-century American women writers
21st-century American women writers